Marianne Skarpnord (born 11 February 1986) is a Norwegian professional golfer playing on the Ladies European Tour.

Amateur career
As a junior, Skarpnord was considered one of the biggest talents in Norwegian golf. In 2003, she won the Girls Amateur Championship, defeating Beatriz Recari of Spain in the final match. She also won the Junior Solheim Cup with Europe the same year. Skarpnord made a 6 footer to secure the win for the European team. In 2004, she finished 3rd in the British Girls Championship. She finished 12th in the qualifying school for the Ladies European Tour and got her tour card for the 2005 season.

Professional career
In 2005, Skarpnord's best finish was a second place in Skandia PGA Open at the Swedish Telia Tour and her best finish at the Ladies European Tour was 22nd in OTP Bank Ladies Central European Open.

The year after, in 2006, Skarpnord finished 2nd in Rejmes Ladies Open on the Telia Tour. On the Ladies European Tour her best finish was 23rd in the Finnair Masters, and 28th in the SAS Masters.

In 2007, after two difficult years, Skarpnord decided to play a full season at the Telia Tour. She won 3 tournaments that year, and one additional 2nd and three 3rd-place finishes. She won the Order of Merit, and secured her card for the 2008 Ladies European Tour.

In 2008, Skarpnord played 21 tournaments on the Ladies European Tour. She made 18 cuts, and her best finish was a 2nd place in the Ladies Irish Open. She also played four tournaments on the Ladies African Tour early in the season, where she had 3 top 4 finishes and 1 top 10. On the Ladies African Tour order of merit she finished 5th total, and on the Ladies European Tour she finished 16th on the moneylist.

2009 was the year Skarpnord got her first win on the Ladies European Tour, defeating Melissa Reid of England by 1 stroke in the Deutsche Bank Ladies Swiss Open. Her second win came in the Carta Sì Ladies Italian Open, defeating Laura Davies in playoff.

Skarpnord qualified for the 2010 LPGA Tour after finishing second in the LPGA Final Qualifying Tournament in Daytona, Florida.

Professional wins (12)

Ladies European Tour wins (5)

Reduced to 18 holes due to weather.
Co-sanctioned by the ALPG Tour.

ALPG Tour wins (3)
2015 (1) Oates Victorian Open
2019 (2) Ballarat Icons ALPG Pro Am, Australian Ladies Classic

Sunshine Ladies Tour wins (1) 
2021 (1) Dimension Data Ladies Challenge

LET Access Series wins (1)
2012 (1) Ladies Norwegian Challenge

Telia Tour wins (3)
2007 (3) Felix Finnish Ladies Open, Smådalarö Gård Open, Ekerum Ladies Masters

Results in LPGA majors
Results not in chronological order before 2019.

^ The Evian Championship was added as a major in 2013.

CUT = missed the half-way cut
NT = no tournament
"T" tied

Ladies European Tour career summary

Team appearances
Amateur
European Girls' Team Championship (representing Norway): 2003, 2004
Junior Solheim Cup: (representing Europe): 2003 (winners)
Espirito Santo Trophy (representing Norway): 2002, 2004

Professional
World Cup (representing Norway): 2007
The Queens (representing Europe): 2015
European Championships (representing Norway): 2018

References

External links

Norwegian female golfers
Ladies European Tour golfers
LPGA Tour golfers
Olympic golfers of Norway
Golfers at the 2016 Summer Olympics
Sportspeople from Viken (county)
People from Sarpsborg
1986 births
Living people